Jurong East MRT station is an elevated Mass Rapid Transit (MRT) interchange station on the North South (NSL) (which terminates at this station) and East West (EWL) lines in Jurong East, Singapore, operated by SMRT Trains. It is located at the heart of Jurong Lake District, within the vicinity of JCube, Jem, Westgate, IMM, Ng Teng Fong General Hospital and Jurong East Bus Interchange.

The station opened on 5 November 1988 as part of the MRT system extension to Jurong. The station was initially the terminus of the Branch line and became the terminus of the NSL after the NSL was merged with the Branch line. An additional track and platforms were added when the station went through upgrades in 2010 as part of the Jurong East Modification Project (JEMP). In 2028, Jurong East station will become an interchange with the Jurong Region Line (JRL). Jurong East station is one of the busiest MRT stations in western Singapore.

History

The Ong Chwee Kou Building Contarctors (OCK)-Sumitomo Construction partnership was pre-qualified for contracts 403 and 404 (which involves the construction of Ulu Pandan Depot to the station and from the station to Lakeside station respectively in May 1985. Originally named Jurong Town and later Jurong, it was renamed to Jurong East on 27 March 1987. The station opened ahead of schedule on 5 November 1988, as part of the  first stage of Phase 2 of the system. The station became the terminus for train services to Choa Chu Kang station when the Branch line opened on 10 March 1990 and later the NSL when the line was extended through Woodlands station and merged with the Branch line.

Jurong East Modification Project

The Jurong East Modification Project (JEMP) was a key infrastructural upgrading project involving the construction of two new platforms and a new track at Jurong East, allowing two trains along the North South Line (NSL) to enter and depart the station concurrently. Previously, trains had to take turns to arrive and depart from the station using a shared middle track. The new platforms and track allowed for improved NSL frequency between Yishun and Jurong East during weekday peak hours and reduced crowding in trains. Contract 1590 for the design, construction and completion of the new above-ground platform station extension adjacent to the existing station and associated viaducts was awarded to Sato Kagyo Pte Ltd at a contract sum of S$127 million.

Originally projected to open in 2012, then Minister for Transport, Mr Raymond Lim, announced on 12 February 2009 that the date was pushed forward by a year, to 2011. Construction started in 2009 and was completed and handed over to the operator at around the first quarter of 2011, with the new platforms and track being tested since then, before the announcement on 16 May 2011 about its operation date on 27 May 2011. To connect the new train tracks to the existing tracks, train services between Joo Koon and Clementi were halted on 4 & 5 September 2010 (affected substation is Chinese Garden, Clementi and possibly Dover), followed by train services between Jurong East and Bukit Gombak on 18 & 19 September 2010 (affected substation is Bukit Gombak).

Initially, the new platforms and track were only operated on weekdays except public holidays, during the morning peak hour period from 7:00 am to 9:00 am. Evening peak hour operation from 5:00 pm to 8:00 pm on weekdays started from 27 December 2011 while the morning peak hour period was extended by an hour later to 10:00 am after the next batch of new trains became ready for revenue service. It was then extended progressively to between 6:00am and 11:00am, and after 5:00pm till 9:00pm. To make full use of the new platforms, terminating NSL trains heading to Ulu Pandan Depot also use Platform A to minimize interference to through services as well as for the last train to Kranji, overnight parking of the trains were being done at Jurong East Platform A from 1:15am to 5:00am daily; the other location that was being done is at Tuas Link Platform A to minimise dispatches from depots at the start of service.

The station was retrofitted with half-height platform screen doors in 2009 which commenced operations on 18 December 2009. High-volume low-speed fans were installed at the station between 2012 and 2013. Noise barriers and privacy screens were installed between January 2011 and September 2014 to reduce the amount of noise generated towards residential areas. The former spans from PIE to Block 266 Toh Guan Road, and from Block 266 Toh Guan Road to Boon Lay Way and Block 108 Jurong East Street 13 to Jurong Town Hall Road in the latter.

Jurong Region Line interchange
On 9 May 2018, LTA announced that Jurong East station would be part of the proposed Jurong Region line (JRL). The station will be constructed as part of Phase 2, JRL (East), consisting of 7 stations between Tengah and Pandan Reservoir, and is expected to be completed in 2028.

Contract J110 for the design and construction of Jurong East JRL station and associated viaducts, including addition & alteration works to the existing station complex, was awarded to Daelim Industrial Co. Ltd at a sum of S$197.4 million. Construction started in 2020, and is planned to be completed in 2028.

To facilitate the construction of the JRL station, the existing Jurong East Bus Interchange was relocated from 6 December 2020 to a temporary interchange built opposite the current site. To allow better accessibility and convenience for commuters, a sheltered pedestrian bridge was built to connect the MRT station to the temporary bus interchange. The temporary interchange is to operate until 2027 when the Jurong East Integrated Transport Hub is to be completed.

Initially expected to open in 2027, restrictions imposed on construction due to the COVID-19 pandemic have led to delays in the JRL line completion, and the date was pushed to 2028.

Station overview
The station was designed by Scott Danielson, and it has a roof which utilises a geometric design similar to the original Jurong East Bus Interchange, in order to fit with the adjacent structure.

The station currently has four tracks and three island platforms serving both the North South and East West lines. It is the terminus for the North South line. To the southeast, the tracks merge into two tracks, while to the northwest the tracks widen into six tracks, four of which are for the North South line. The four tracks later merge into two. As part of the JEMP, a new platform was built to allow two trains along the North South Line to enter and depart the station at the same time. Previously, trains had to take turns to arrive and depart from the station using a shared middle track, which has been overcrowded during peak hours. Currently, the new platforms A and B are only opened on weekdays (except public holidays) during morning and evening peak hours.

References

External links

 
 Official blogsite

Railway stations in Singapore opened in 1988
M
Mass Rapid Transit (Singapore) stations